The 2017 IFMAR 1:10 Electric Off-Road World Championships was the seventeenth IFMAR 1:10 Electric Off-Road World Championship was held in Xiamen China between the 11–18 November 2017.

Circuit
The Xiamen ARC International Raceway is situated in Xiamen. The newly constructed track is 42m wide by 35m deep designed by Lung Chuan Lee from Taiwan who also designed the onroad track layout in Beijing last year. The event was held on a dirt having that had been both glued and then sugared. The circuit has a purpose built building alongside. Housing on the first floor the drivers standing area, pits and tyre tech and on the second floor and a third floor for spectating for both the offroad track and on the other side of the building a high standard onroad track.

Racing was close and highly competitive but {{flagicon Ryan Maifield|USA}} managed to secure both titles.

Classification
Note: A-main only.

2WD Results

4WD Results

External links
Official Website  www dot xm2017worlds dot com now defunct
Official Results 2WD IFMAR World Championships :: 2017 IFMAR 1:10 2WD Electric Off-Road :: LiveRC
Official Results 4WD IFMAR World Championships :: 2017 IFMAR 1:10 4WD Electric Off-Road :: LiveRC
2wd Live Video Coverage 2wd (Heat 1/14) [P1 Race #1 :: 11/12/2017 :: IFMAR World Championships]
4wd Live Video Coverage 4wd (Heat 1/10) [P1 Race #1 :: 11/16/2017 :: IFMAR World Championships]

References

IFMAR 1:10 Electric Off-Road World Championship